Vladimir Taymurazovich Salbiyev (born 29 April 1982) is a former Russian professional footballer.

External links
 
 

1982 births
Russian people of Ossetian descent
Living people
Russian footballers
Association football midfielders
FC Khimik-Arsenal players
FC Olimpia Volgograd players
FC Slavia Mozyr players
Belarusian Premier League players
Russian expatriate footballers
Expatriate footballers in Belarus
FC Amur Blagoveshchensk players